Stevenson's dwarf gecko (Lygodactylus stevensoni) is a species of lizard in the family Gekkonidae. The species is native to southern Africa.

Etymology
The specific name, stevensoni, is in honor of James Stevenson-Hamilton, the "father" of Kruger National Park.

Geographic range
L. stevensoni is found in northeastern South Africa and southwestern Zimbabwe.

Habitat
The preferred natural habitat of L. stevensoni is wooded granite-hills, where it is found on rocks and beneath the bark of dead trees.

Description

Reproduction
L. stevensoni is oviparous.

References

Further reading
Hewitt J (1926). "Descriptions of some new species of batrachians and lizards from South Africa". Annals of the Natal Museum, Pietermaritzburg 5: 435–448. (Lygodactylus stevensoni, new species).
Röll B, Pröhl H, Hoffmann K-P (2010). "Multigene phylogenetic analysis of Lygodactylus dwarf geckos (Squamata: Gekkonidae)". Molecular Phylogenetics and Evolution 56 (1): 327–335.
Rösler H (2000). "Kommentierte Liste der rezent, subrezent und fossil bekannten Geckotaxa (Reptilia: Gekkonomorpha)". Gekkota 2: 28–153. (Lygodactylus stevensoni, p. 94). (in German).

Lygodactylus
Reptiles of South Africa
Reptiles of Zimbabwe
Reptiles described in 1926
Taxa named by John Hewitt (herpetologist)